Tsvetan Krastev (Bulgarian: Цветан Кръстев; born 3 December 1978) is a Bulgarian retired football defender and referee in Bulgarian A Group, B Group and Bulgarian Cup.

Referee career
Since season 2010 he is a football referee in B Group. In 2011, he made his debut in A Group as Referee. He referred 2013 Bulgarian Cup Final. He retired on 18 April 2016 due to an injury.

Football career
Krastev is youth  player of Sokol Plovdiv. He has played for Litex Lovech, Spartak Varna, Botev Plovdiv and Rodopa Smolyan

Career statistics

Club

References

External links

1978 births
Living people
Bulgarian footballers
Bulgaria international footballers
PFC Litex Lovech players
First Professional Football League (Bulgaria) players
Bulgarian football referees
Association football defenders
Sportspeople from Varna, Bulgaria